Paul Schulze (22 October 1882 – 1918) was a German cyclist. He competed in four events at the 1908 Summer Olympics.

References

External links
 

1882 births
1918 deaths
German male cyclists
Olympic cyclists of Germany
Cyclists at the 1908 Summer Olympics
Cyclists from Berlin
20th-century German people